The Grand Prix Hassan II is an annual men's tennis tournament on the ATP Tour and is currently part of the ATP Tour 250 series. The event is played on clay courts and was held annually at the Complexe Al Amal in Casablanca, Morocco through 2015, before relocating to Marrakesh in 2016. Between 1984 and 1989 it was part of the Challenger Series.  It is currently the only ATP event held in Africa. The tournament is usually held in April and is a lead up tournament for the French Open.

Past finals

Key

Singles

Doubles

References

External links
 Official website
 ATP tournament profile

 
Tennis tournaments in Morocco
Clay court tennis tournaments
ATP Tour
Recurring sporting events established in 1986
Spring (season) events in Morocco